Centromere-associated protein E is a protein that in humans is encoded by the CENPE gene.

Centromere-associated protein E is a kinesin-like motor protein that accumulates in the G2 phase of the cell cycle. Unlike other centromere-associated proteins, it is not present during interphase and first appears at the centromere region of chromosomes during prometaphase. CENPE is proposed to be one of the motors responsible for mammalian chromosome movement and/or spindle elongation.

CENPE is also called Kinesin-7.

Clinical significance 
Mutations in CENPE result in autosomal recessive primary microcephaly type 13, which includes skeletal abnormalities and immunodeficiency.

See also 

 CENPF
CENPJ
 CENPT

References

Further reading